Overseas Indians, officially Non-Resident Indians (NRIs) and Overseas Citizens of India (OCIs) are Indians who live outside of the Republic of India. According to the Government of India, Non-Resident Indians are citizens of India who are not living in the country, while the term People of Indian Origin (PIOs) are people of Indian birth or ancestry who are not citizens of India, but are citizens of other nations and may additionally have Overseas Citizenship of India (OCI), with those having the OCI status known as Overseas Citizens of India. According to a Ministry of External Affairs report, there are 32 million NRIs and OCIs residing outside India and overseas Indians comprise the world's largest overseas diaspora. Every year 2.5 million (25 lakhs) Indians migrate overseas, which is the highest annual number of migrants in the world.

Legal framework

Non-resident Indian (NRI)
Strictly asserting, the term says non-resident refers only to the tax status of a citizen who, as per section 6 of The Income-tax Act, 1961, has not resided in India for a specified period for the purposes of the Income Tax Act. The rates of income tax are different for persons who are "resident in India" and for NRIs. For the purposes of the Income Tax Act, "residence in India" requires stay in India of at least 182 days in a financial year or 365 days spread out over four consecutive years and at least 60 days in that year. According to the act, any Indian citizen who does not meet the criteria as a "resident of India" is a non-resident of India and is treated as NRI for paying income tax. NRI status do not restrict some one to invest in India. Currency trading, also known as currency trading or foreign exchange trading, is a global market where all the foreign currency from across the globe are traded, bought and sold. The market for foreign exchange is the largest in the world. The market has an average trading volume of over 5 trillion dollars a day. Through FET NRI money can be invested.

Overseas Citizenship of India (OCI)

After multiple efforts by leaders across the Indian political spectrum, a long term visa scheme was established, the "Overseas Citizenship of India", commonly referred to as the OCI card. The name is itself misleading, as it doesn't offer Indian citizenship. The Constitution of India does not permit full dual citizenship. The OCI card is effectively a long-term visa, with restrictions on voting rights and government jobs. The card is available to certain Overseas ex-Indians, and while it affords holders residency and other rights, it does have restrictions, and is not considered to be any type of Indian citizenship from a constitutional perspective.

Person of Indian origin (PIO)
A person of Indian origin (PIO) was a form of identification means a foreign citizen (except a national of Pakistan, Afghanistan, Bangladesh, China, Iran, Bhutan, Sri Lanka and/or Nepal), who:
 at any time held an Indian passport (but not currently) or
 either of their parents/grandparents/great-grandparents were born and permanently resident in India as defined in Government of India Act, 1935 and other territories that became part of India thereafter provided neither was at any time a citizen of any of the aforesaid countries (as referred above) or
 is a spouse of a citizen of India or a PIO.
Prime minister Narendra Modi announced on 28 September 2014 that PIO and OCI cards would be merged.  On 9 January 2015, the Person of Indian Origin Card scheme was withdrawn by the Government of India and was merged with the Overseas Citizen of India card scheme. PIO cardholders must apply to convert their existing cards into OCI cards. The Bureau of Immigration stated that it would continue to accept the old PIO cards as valid travel documents until 31 December 2023.

Comparison

Notes

History of emigration from India

Spread of Indic religions

Arabian peninsula

Central Asia
Narimsimhan et al. (2018) have found that there was an "Indus periphery" population living in Central Asia during the Bronze Age. They had migrated from the Indus Valley civilisation and had settled down in BMAC settlements to trade, this is corroborated by the discovery of Indus Valley seals in Central Asia.

The modern Indian merchant diaspora in Central Asia and Arabia emerged in the mid-16th century and remained active for over four centuries. Astrakhan at the mouth of the Volga was the first place in the Tsardom of Russia where an Indian merchant colony was established as early as the 1610s. Russian chroniclers reported the presence of Hindu traders in Moscow and St Petersburg in the 18th century.

Multani people from Multan, Shikarpur and Mawar of both Hindu and Muslim background acted as bankers and merchants in Safavid Persia. Hindu merchants in Hamadan were massacred by Ottomans as stated by an Armenian, with the Indian merchant community plummeting due to the Ottoman and Afghan wars in Iran (1722–27). In Kerman, traders of Hindu background had a caravanserai. Traders of Indian background were mentioned by Jean Chardin, Jean de Thévenot, Adam Olearius and F. A. Kotov in the Safavid dynasty in Persia where they lived along with Jews and Armenians. Traders from India of Sikh and Hindu background lived in the Qajar and Zand dynasties in Persia after a clampdown by Nader Shah and the Afghan Ghilzar wars in Iran.

Sarmarqandi and Bukharan traders bought Indian indigo from merchants of Hindu origin in Kandahar in 1783 according to George Forester. The tallest houses were owned by Hindus according to Elphinstone in 1815. Lumsden recorded 350 stores owned by Hindus in Kandahar. Finance, precious metals, and textiles were all dealt with by Sikhs and Hindus in Kandahar.

A Hindu worked for Timur Shah Durrani in Afghanistan. Peshawar Hindus were in Kabul by 1783. Money lending was the main occupation of Hindus in Kabul. Armenians and Hindus lived in Kabul according to an 1876 survey. Jews and Hindus lived in Herat in the 1800s. Sindhi Shikarpur Hindus, Jews, and Arabs lived in Balkh in 1886. Sindhi and Punjabi were the languages used by Indians in Afghanistan. Some Afghan cities including Kabul have places of worship for Hindus and Sikhs. Local citizenship has been obtained in Afghanistan by Hindu and Sikh traders.

Peshawari and Shikarpuri Indian traders were involved in Central Asia. The Shikarpuri invested in grain in the Bukharan Emirate as well as Ferghana cotton. They also engaged in legal money lending in Bukhara, which they could not legally do in Russian Turkestan. Jews, Hindus, Baluch, Persians, and Arabs lived in Samarkand, and Hindus and Baháʼís live in Baluchistan and Khorasan in Iran.

Han Chinese men, Hindu men, Armenian men, Jewish men and Russian men were married by Uyghur Muslim women who could not find husbands. Uyghur merchants would harass Hindu usurers by screaming at them asking them if they ate beef or hanging cow skins on their quarters. Uyghur men also rioted and attacked Hindus for marrying Uyghur women in 1907 in Poskam and Yarkand like Ditta Ram calling for their beheading and stoning Indians to death as they engaged in anti-Hindu violence.  Hindu Indian usurers engaging in a religious procession led to violence against them by Muslim Uyghurs. In 1896 two Uyghur Turkis attacked a Hindu merchant and the British consul Macartney demanded the Uyghurs be punished by flogging.

The money lenders and merchants of Hindu background from British India in Xinjiang were guaranteed by the British Consul-General. Russian refugees, missionaries, and British-Indian merchants and money lenders of Hindu background were potential targets of gangs of Kashgaris so the Consulate-General of Britain was a potential shelter. The killings of two Hindus at the hands of Uighurs took place in the Shamba Bazaar in a most brutal fashion. The plundering of the valuables of slaughtered British Indian Hindus happened in Posgam on 25 March 1933, and on the previous day in Karghalik at the hands of Uighurs. Killings of Hindus took place in Khotan at the hands of the Bughra Amirs. Antagonism against both the British and Hindus ran high among the Muslim Turki Uyghur rebels in Xinjiang's southern area. Muslims plundered the possessions in Karghalik of Rai Sahib Dip Chand, who was the aksakal of Britain, and his fellow Hindus on 24 March 1933, and in Keryia they slaughtered British Indian Hindus. Sind's Shikarpur district was the origin of the Hindu diaspora there. The slaughter of the Hindus from British India was called the "Karghalik Outrage". The Muslims had killed nine of them. The forced removal of the Swedes was accompanied by the slaughter of the Hindus in Khotan by the Islamic Turkic rebels. The Emirs of Khotan slaughtered the Hindus as they forced the Swedes out and declared sharia in Khotan on 16 March 1933.

Southeast Asia

A major emigration from the Indian subcontinent was to Southeast Asia. There is a possibility that the first wave of Indian migration towards Southeast Asia occurred when Emperor Ashoka invaded Kalinga and following Samudragupta's expedition towards the South. This was followed by early interaction of Indian traders with South Asians and, after the mid-first millennium CE, by the emigration of members of the Brahmin social caste. This resulted in the establishment of the Indianised kingdoms in Southeast Asia. The Chola rulers, who were known for their naval power, conquered Sumatra and the Malay Peninsula. 

Another early diaspora, of which little is known was a reported Indian "Shendu" community that was recorded when Yunnan was annexed by the Han dynasty in the 1st century by the Chinese authorities.

European Colonial rule (to 1947)

During the mid-19th century right after the British Colonial disasters ended, much of the migration that occurred was of pioneering Girmitya indentured workers – mostly Bhojpuri and Awadhi-speaking people from the Bhojpur district of Uttar Pradesh and Bihar to other British colonies under the Indian indenture system. The major destinations were Mauritius, Guyana, Trinidad and Tobago, Suriname, other parts of the Caribbean (e.g. Jamaica, Guadeloupe, Martinique, Belize, Barbados, Grenada, Saint Vincent and the Grenadines, Saint Lucia), Fiji, Réunion, Seychelles, Malay Peninsula (e.g. Malaysia and Singapore), East Africa (e.g. Kenya, Somalia, Tanzania, Uganda) and South Africa.

Gujarati and Sindhi merchants and traders settled in the Arabian Peninsula, Aden, Oman, Bahrain, Dubai, South Africa and East African countries, most of which were ruled by the British. The Indian Rupee was the legal currency in many countries of Arabian peninsula. Punjabi, Rajasthani, Sindhi, Baloch and Kashmiri Camel drivers were brought to Australia.

Post-independence
After gaining independence from the British Raj, unlike internal migration, senior government leaders have historically not vocalized opinions on international emigration. As a result, it remains a political issue only in states with major emigrant populations, such as Kerala, Punjab, Tamil Nadu and to a lesser degree Gujarat, Andhra Pradesh and Goa. However, the phenomenon continues to be a major force in India's economic (Foreign direct investment), social and political relations with nations having significant Indian populace.

Overseas experience

Love for India

Indophilia or Indomania is love, admiration or special interest for India or its people and culture. Indophile is someone who loves India, Indian culture, cuisine, religions, history or its people.

Overseas discrimination

Demography by country

Diaspora by host country

Africa

Madagascar

Indians in Madagascar are descended mostly from traders who arrived in 19th century looking for better opportunities. The majority of them came from the Indian west coast state of Gujarat and were known as Karana (Muslim) and Bania (Hindu). The majority speak Gujarati, though some other Indian languages are spoken. Nowadays the younger generations speak at least three languages including French or English, Gujarati and Malagasy.

Mauritius

The people are known as Indo-Mauritians, and form about 65.8% of the population. The majority of them are Hindu (73.7%) and a significant group are Muslims (26.3%). Mauritius is the only Hindu majority (48.5%) country of Africa according to the 2011 census. There are also a relatively small number of Baháʼís and Sikhs. The mother tongue of Indo-Mauritians is Creole, as well as French and English in general fields, however various Indian languages are still spoken, especially Bhojpuri, Tamil, Hindi, Marathi, Odia, Telugu, and Urdu as they are used in religious activities.

Mauritius hosts the Aapravasi Ghat, the only site of UNESCO in the world, to pay homage to the memory of indenture. The Indian Festivals of Maha Shivaratri, Diwali, Thaipusam, Ponggal, Ganesh Chaturthi and Ugadi are all National Holidays as well as the Annual Commemoration of the Arrival of Indian Indentured Labourers in Mauritius.

Réunion

Indians make up a quarter of Réunion's population. Most originally came as indentured workers from Tamil Nadu.

South Africa

Most Asians in South Africa are descended from indentured Indian labourers who were brought by the British from India in the 19th century, mostly to work on the sugar cane plantations of what is now the province of KwaZulu-Natal (KZN). The majority are of Tamil speaking heritage along with people that speak Hindi or Bhojpuri, mostly descending from Bihar and Uttar Pradesh. There are also smaller numbers of Telugu speaking communities while a minority are descended from Indian traders who migrated to South Africa at around the same time, many from Gujarat. The city of Durban has the highest number of Asians in sub-Saharan Africa, and the Indian independence leader Mahatma Gandhi worked as a lawyer in the country in the early 1900s. South Africa has one of the highest number of people of Indian descent outside of India in the world, i.e. born in South Africa and not migrant. Most of them are fourth or fifth-generation descendants. Most Indian South Africans do not speak any Indian languages, as they were 'lost' over the generations, although some do enjoy watching Indian movies and listening to Indian music, and they maintain (and have had imposed upon them) a strong Indian racial identity as a consequence of the legacy of Apartheid.

East Africa

 
Before the larger wave of migration during the British colonial era, a significant group of South Asians, especially from the west coast (Sindh, Surat, Konkan and Malabar) travelled regularly to South East Africa, especially Zanzibar. It is believed that they travelled in Arab dhows, Maratha Navy ships (under Kanhoji Angre), and possibly Chinese junks and Portuguese vessels. Some of these people settled in South-East Africa and later spread to places like present day Uganda, and Mozambique. Later they mingled with the much larger wave of South Asians who came with the British.

Indian migration to the modern countries of Kenya, Uganda, Mauritius, South Africa, and Tanzania began nearly a century ago when these parts of the continent were under British and French colonial rule. Most of these migrants were of Gujarati or Punjabi origin. There are almost three million Indians living in South-East Africa. Indian-led businesses were (or are) the backbone of the economies of these countries. These ranged in the past from small rural grocery stores to sugar mills. In addition, Indian professionals, such as doctors, teachers, engineers, also played an important part in the development of these countries.

Asia

Indonesia

The official figures, it is estimated that there are around 125,000 Indians living in Indonesia and 25,000 PIOs/NRIs living in Indonesia of which the Indian expatriate community registered with the embassy and consulate in Medan numbers around 5,000-7,000 people. Most are from Tamil descendants. There are other sources stated that there are more than 400,000 Indians in Indonesia.

Indians have been living in Indonesia for centuries, from the time of the Srivijaya and Majapahit Empire both of which were Hindu and heavily influenced by the subcontinent. Indians were later brought to Indonesia by the Dutch in the 19th century as indentured labourers to work on plantations located around Medan in Sumatra. While the majority of these came from South India, a significant number also came from the north of India. The Medan Indians included Hindus, Muslims and Sikhs. They have now been in Indonesia for over four generations and hold Indonesian passports. While local statistics continue to suggest that there are some 40,000 PIOs in Sumatra, the vast majority are now completely assimilated into Indonesian society, though some elements of the Tamil, Punjabi and Odia communities still maintain their cultural traditions.

The Indian diaspora also includes several thousand Sindhi families who constitute the second wave of Indian immigrants who made Indonesia their home in the first half of the 20th century. The Sindhi community is mainly engaged in trading and commerce.

Among these communities, Tamils and to a lesser extent Sikhs were primarily engaged in agriculture while Sindhis and Punjabis mainly established themselves in textile trade and sports businesses.

The inflow of major Indian investments in Indonesia starting in the late 1970s drew a fresh wave of Indian investors and managers to this country. This group of entrepreneurs and business professionals has further expanded over the past two decades and now includes engineers, consultants, chartered accountants, bankers and other professionals.

The Indian community is very well regarded in Indonesia, is generally prosperous, and includes individuals holding senior positions in local and multinational companies.

Due to economic factors, most traders and businessmen among PIOs have over past decades moved to Jakarta from outlying areas such as Medan and Surabaya. Almost half the Indian Community in Indonesia is now Jakarta-based; it is estimated that the population of Jakarta's Indian community is about 19,000. There are six main social or professional associations in Jakarta's Indian PIO/NRI community. Gandhi Seva Loka (formerly known as Bombay Merchants Association) is a charitable institution run by the Sindhi community and is engaged mainly in educational and social activities. The India Club is a social organisation of PIO/NRI professionals. An Indian Women's Association brings together PIO/NRI spouses and undertakes charitable activities. There is a Gurudwara Prabandhak Committee in Jakarta and Sindhis as well, Sikhs are associated with Gurudwara activities. The Economic Association of Indonesia and India (ECAII) brings together leading entrepreneurs from the Indian community with the objective of promoting bilateral economic relations, but it has been largely inactive. Finally, there is the Indonesian Chapter of the Institute of Chartered Accountants of India (ICAI).

Japan

Indians in Japan consist of migrants from India to Japan and their descendants. , There are currently around 40,000 Indians living in Japan. Roughly 60% consist of expatriate IT professionals and their families.

Malaysia

Malaysia has one of the world's largest overseas Indian and overseas Chinese populations. Most Indians migrated to Malaysia as plantation labourers under British rule. They are a significant minority ethnic group, making up 8% or 2,410,000 as 2017 of the Malaysian population. 85% of these people are Tamil-speaking. They have retained their languages and religion – 88% of ethnic Indians in Malaysia identify as Hindus. A minority number of the population are Sikhs and Muslims.

There is also a small community of Indian origin, the Chitty, who are the descendants of only Tamil traders who had emigrated before 1500 CE. Considering themselves Tamil, speaking Malay, and practicing Hinduism, the Chittys number about 200,000 today.

Nepal

In 2006, the newly formed Nepal parliament passed the controversial citizenship act Nepali nationality law that allowed nearly two million Indians especially those living in the Madhesh province of Nepal to acquire Nepalese citizenship and Nepalese identity via naturalisation. The total number of Indian citizens temporarily living and working in Nepal is estimated to be somewhere between two and three million. Nepal is also the seventh largest source of remittance to India, which amounted to nearly $3.5 billion in 2013/2014.

Philippines

Currently, there are over 150,000 people of Indian origin residing in Philippines. By law, Indian Filipinos are defined as Philippine citizens of Indian descent.

India and the Philippines have historic cultural and economic ties going back over 3,000 years. Iron Age finds in the Philippines point to the existence of trade between Tamil Nadu in South India and what are today the Philippine Islands during the ninth and tenth centuries BCE. The influence of Indian culture on Filipino cultures intensified from the 2nd through the late 14th centuries CE, impacting various fields such as language, politics, and religion.

During the Seven Years' War, Indians from Chennai, and Tamil Nadu were part of the British expedition against Spanish Manila, taking the city from the Spanish East Indies government and occupying the surrounding areas until Caintâ and Morong (today in Rizal province) between 1762 and 1763. Following the end war's end, a number of Indian soldiers mutinied, settled, and married local Tagalog women. These Sepoy Indians still have descendants in the town today.

Singapore

Indian Singaporeans – defined as persons of South Asian paternal ancestry – form 9% of the country's citizens and permanent residents, making them Singapore's third largest ethnic group. Among cities, Singapore has one of the largest overseas Indian populations.

Although contact with ancient India left a deep cultural impact on Singapore's indigenous Malay society, the mass migration of ethnic Indians to the island only began with the founding of modern Singapore by the British in 1819. Initially, the Indian population was transient, mainly comprising young men who came as workers, soldiers and convicts. By the mid-20th century, a settled community had emerged, with a more balanced gender ratio and a better spread of age groups. Tamil is one among the four official languages of Singapore alongside English, Chinese and Malay.

Singapore's Indian population is notable for its class stratification, with disproportionately large elite and lower income groups. This long-standing problem has grown more visible since the 1990s with an influx of both well-educated and unskilled migrants from India, and as part of growing income inequality in Singapore. Indians earn higher incomes than Malays, the other major minority group. Indians are also significantly more likely to hold university degrees than these groups. However, the mainly locally born Indian students in public primary and secondary schools under-perform the national average at major examinations.

Singapore Indians are linguistically and religiously diverse, with South Indians and Hindus forming majorities. Indian culture has endured and evolved over almost 200 years. By the mid to late 20th century, it had become somewhat distinct from contemporary South Asian cultures, even as Indian elements became diffused within a broader Singaporean culture. Since the 1990s, new Indian immigrants have increased the size and complexity of the local Indian population. Together with modern communications like cable television and the Internet, this has connected Singapore with an emerging global Indian culture.

Prominent Indian individuals have long made a mark in Singapore as leaders of various fields in national life. Indians are also collectively well-represented, and sometimes over-represented, in areas such as politics, education, diplomacy and the law.

There is also a small community of Indian origin, the Chitty, who are the descendants of Tamil traders who had emigrated before 1500 CE. Considering themselves Tamil, speaking Tamil, and practice Hinduism, the Chittys number about 2,000 today.

Caribbean

From 1838 to 1917, over half a million Indians from the former British India, were brought to the Caribbean as indentured laborers to address the demand for labour following the abolition of slavery. The first two ships arrived in British Guiana (now Guyana) on 5 May 1838.

The majority of the Indians living in the English-speaking Caribbean and Suriname migrated from the Bhojpur region in present-day eastern Uttar Pradesh, western Bihar and northwestern Jharkhand and the Awadh region in eastern Uttar Pradesh, while a significant minority came from South India. Most of the Indians brought to Guadeloupe, Martinique and French Guiana were mostly from  Tamil Nadu, Andhra Pradesh, Telangana, and other parts of South India. A minority emigrated from other parts of South Asia. Other Indo-Caribbean people are descend from or are later migrants, including Indian doctors, businessmen, and other professionals. Many of them being of Sindhi, Punjabi, Gujarati, Kutchi, Bengali, Tamil, and Telugu origin. Many Indo-Caribbeans have further migrated and settled to other countries, such as the United States, Canada, the United Kingdom, the Netherlands, and France, with sizable populations in the metropolitan areas of New York, Toronto, Miami-Fort Lauderdale-West Palm Beach, Orlando-Ocala, Minneapolis–Saint Paul, Tampa Bay, Winnipeg, Montreal, Vancouver, Houston–The Woodlands–Sugar Land, Washington, D.C., Schenectady, Calgary, London, Rotterdam-Den Haag, and Amsterdam.

Indo-Caribbeans are the largest ethnic group in Guyana, Suriname, and Trinidad and Tobago. They are the second largest group in Jamaica, Saint Vincent and the Grenadines and other countries. There are small populations of them in Bahamas, Barbados, Belize, French Guiana, Grenada, Panama, Guatemala, St. Lucia, Haiti, Martinique, Guadeloupe, and the Netherlands Antilles.

Europe

Netherlands and Suriname

There are around 120,000 people of Indian origin in the Netherlands, 90% of whom migrated from the former Dutch colony of Suriname, where their forefathers were brought as workers to farm and tend to crops in the former Dutch colonies.

Indo-Surinamese are nationals of Suriname of Indian or other South Asian ancestry. After the Dutch government signed a treaty with the United Kingdom on the recruitment of contract workers, Indians began migrating to Suriname in 1873 from what was then British India as indentured labourers, many from the modern-day Indian states of Uttar Pradesh, Bihar and the surrounding regions. Just before and just after the independence of Suriname on 25 November 1975 many Indo-Surinamese emigrated to the Netherlands.

During the heyday of British rule in India, many people from India were sent to other British colonies for work. In the Dutch colony of Suriname, the Dutch were allowed by the British Raj to recruit labourers in certain parts of the North-Indian United Provinces. Today, Europe's largest Hindu temple is currently situated in The Hague.

United Kingdom

The Indian emigrant community in the United Kingdom is now in its third generation. Indians in the UK are the largest community outside of Asia proportionally, and the second largest in terms of population, only surpassed by the United States, and closely followed by Canada. The first wave of Indians in the United Kingdom worked as manual labourers and were not respected within society. However, this has changed considerably. On the whole, third and fourth generation immigrants are proving to be very successful, especially in the fields of law, business and medicine.

Indian culture has been constantly referenced within the wider British culture, at first as an "exotic" influence in films like My Beautiful Laundrette, but now increasingly as a familiar feature in films like Bend It Like Beckham.

The United Kingdom Census 2011 recorded 1,451,862 people of Indian ethnicity resident in the UK (not including those who categorised themselves as of mixed ethnicity). The main ethnic groups are Gujaratis, Punjabis, Bengalis, Hindi-speaking people, Tamils, Telugus, Malayalis, Goan-Konkanis, Sindhis, Marathis, and Anglo-Indians. Hindus comprise 49% of the British Indian population, Sikhs 22.1%, Muslims 13.9%, Christians nearly 10%, with the remainder made up of Jains (15,000), Parsis (Zoroastrians), and Buddhists.

Most Indians in the United Kingdom have settled in London, the Midlands, the North West, Yorkshire and the South East. Their presence in Scotland, Wales, Northern Ireland and other regions is not as large. The first generation of immigrants were to be found in the east-end of London, which was traditionally the poorest area of London, however, due to gentrification, this is no longer the case.

There are 2,360,000 people currently speaking Indian languages in the United Kingdom. Punjabi is now the second most widely spoken language in the United Kingdom, and the most frequently spoken language among school pupils who do not have English as a first language. In 2019, the first ever Indian diaspora think tank was created, as a charity, called Bridge India.

Rishi Sunak became the first British Indian (non-white) Prime Minister of the United Kingdom in October 2022.

North America
Search terms can be confusing, because some of the indigenous people of the Americas are referred to, either legally or informally, as Indians. See for example Indian Act, Indian Register, Indian reserves.

Canada

According to Statistics Canada, via the 2021 Canadian census, 1,858,755 persons classified themselves as being of Indian origin, comprising approximately 5.1% of the total Canadian population. Unlike in India however, representation of various minority religious groups is much higher amongst the Indo-Canadian population. For instance in India, Sikhs comprise 2% and Christians 2.2% of the population of India, Hindus 80% and Muslims 14%. In 2011, Sikhs represented 35%, Hindus represented 28%, Muslims 17%, Christians 16% of the total people of Indian origin in Canada.

A Punjabi community has existed in British Columbia, Canada, for over 120 years. The first known Indian settlers in Canada were Indian Army soldiers who had passed through Canada in 1897 on their way home from attending Queen Victoria's Diamond Jubilee celebration in London, England. Some are believed to have remained in British Columbia and others returned there later. Punjabi Indians were attracted to the possibilities for farming and forestry. They were mainly male Sikhs who were seeking work opportunities. Indo-Caribbeans, descendants of the Indian indentured workers who had gone to the Caribbean since 1838, made an early appearance in Canada with the arrival of the Trinidadian medical student Kenneth Mahabir and the Demerara (now Guyana) clerk M N Santoo, both in 1908.

The first Indian immigrants in British Columbia allegedly faced widespread racism from the majority Anglo community. Race riots targeted these immigrants, as well as new Chinese immigrants. Most decided to return to India, while a few stayed behind. The Canadian government prevented these men from bringing their wives and children until 1919, another reason why many of them chose to leave. Quotas were established to prevent many Indians from moving to Canada in the early 20th century. These quotas allowed fewer than 100 people from India a year until 1957, when the number was increased to 300. In 1967, all quotas were scrapped. Immigration was then based on a point system, thus allowing many more Indians to enter. Since this open-door policy was adopted, Indians continue to come in large numbers, and roughly 25,000-30,000 arrive each year, which now makes Indians the second highest group immigrating to Canada each year, after the Chinese.

Most Indians choose to emigrate to larger urban centres like Toronto, and Vancouver, where more than 70% live. Smaller communities are also growing in Calgary, Edmonton, Montreal, and Winnipeg. A place called Little India exists in South Vancouver and a section of Gerrard Street in Toronto as well. Indians in Vancouver live mainly in the suburb of Surrey, or nearby Abbotsford but are also found in other parts of Vancouver. The vast majority of Vancouver Indians are of Punjabi Sikh origin and have taken significant roles in politics and other professions, with several Supreme Court justices, three attorneys general and one provincial premier hailing from the community. Both Gurmant Grewal and his wife Nina Grewal were the first married couple in Canada to be concurrently elected as Member of Parliament in 2004. The most read newspaper in the Indian community is The Asian Star and The Punjabi Star based in Vancouver started by an immigrant from Mumbai-Shamir Doshi.

The Greater Toronto Area contains the second largest population of Indian descent in North America, enumerating 572,250 residents of Indian origin as of 2011, surpassed only by the 592,888 estimate by the 2011 American Community Survey (and 659,784 in 2013) for the New York City Combined Statistical Area. Note, however, that the Toronto count (but not the New York count) includes individuals of West Indian/Indo-Caribbean descent. Compared to the Vancouver area, Toronto's Indian community is much more linguistically and religiously diverse with large communities of Gujaratis, Bengalis, Malayalis, and Tamils, including Tamil ethnic minority from Sri Lanka, as well as more Indians who are Hindu, Sikh and Muslim than Vancouver. From Toronto, Canadian carrier Air Canada operates non-stop flights to Delhi and Mumbai.

United States

The United States has the largest Indian population in the world outside Asia. Indian immigration to North America started as early as the 1890s. Emigration to the United States also started in the late 19th and early 20th century, when Sikhs arriving in Vancouver found that the fact that they were subjects of the British Empire did not mean anything in Canada itself, and they were blatantly discriminated against. Some of these pioneers entered the US or landed in Seattle and San Francisco as the ships that carried them from Asia often stopped at these ports. Most of these immigrants were Sikhs from the Punjab region.

Asian women were restricted from immigrating because the US government passed laws in 1917, at the behest of California and other states in the west, which had experienced a large influx of Chinese, Japanese, and Indian immigrants during and after the gold rush. As a result, many of the South Asian men in California married Mexican women. A fair number of these families settled in the Central Valley in California as farmers, and continue to this day. These early immigrants were denied voting rights, family re-unification and citizenship. In 1923 the Supreme Court of the United States, in United States v. Bhagat Singh Thind, ruled that people from India (at the time, British India, e.g. South Asians) were ineligible for citizenship. Bhagat Singh Thind was a Sikh from India who settled in Oregon; he had applied earlier for citizenship and was rejected there. Thind became a citizen a few years later in New York.

After World War II, US immigration policy changed, after almost a half century, to allow family re-unification for people of non-white origin. In addition, Asians were allowed to become citizens and to vote. Many men who arrived before the 1940s were finally able to bring their families to the US; most of them in this earlier era settled in California and other west coast states.

Another wave of Indian immigrants entered the US after independence of India. A large proportion of them were Sikhs joining their family members under the newly more (though not completely) colour-blind immigration laws, then Malayali immigrants from Middle East, Kerala, etc. and professionals or students came from all over India. The Cold War created a need for engineers in the defence and aerospace industries, some of whom came from India. By the late 1980s and early 1990s, large numbers of Gujarati, Telugu, and Tamil people had settled in the US. The most recent and probably the largest wave of immigration to date occurred in the late 1990s and early 2000s during the internet boom. As a result, Indians in the US are now one of the largest among the groups of immigrants with an estimated population of about 3.2 million, or ~1.0% of the US population according to American Community Survey of 2010 data. The demographics of Indian Americans have accordingly changed from majority Sikh to majority Hindu, with Sikhs only comprising 10% to 20% of Indian Americans today. This is much smaller than the proportion of Sikhs amongst the Indian populations in the United Kingdom, Canada, Australia, and New Zealand, but larger than in India. In 2018, with 25% of the population of all non-resident migrants in the US, Indians made up the highest number of non-resident migrants (those without US citizenship or green card). The US Census Bureau uses the term Asian Indian to avoid confusion with the indigenous peoples of the Americas commonly referred to as American Indians.

In contrast to the earliest groups of Indians who entered the US workforce as taxi drivers, labourers, farmers, or small business owners, the later arrivals often came as professionals or completed graduate studies in the US and moved into professional occupations. They have become very successful financially thanks to highly technical industries, and are thus probably the most well-off community of immigrants. They are well represented in all walks of life, but particularly so in academia, information technology, and medicine. There were over 4,000 PIO professors and 84,000 Indianborn students in American universities in 2007–08. The American Association of Physicians of Indian Origin has a membership of 35,000. In 2000, Fortune magazine estimated the wealth generated by Indian Silicon Valley entrepreneurs at around $250 billion. Many IT companies like Google, Microsoft, Twitter, Adobe and IBM have CEOs of Indian origin.

Patel Brothers is the world's large supermarket chain serving the Indian diaspora, with 57 locations in 19 U.S. states—primarily located in the New Jersey/New York Metropolitan Area, due to its large Indian population, and with the East Windsor/Monroe Township, New Jersey location representing the world's largest and busiest Indian grocery store outside India.

The New York City Metropolitan Area, including Manhattan, Queens, and Nassau County in New York State, and most of New Jersey, is home to, by far, the largest Indian population in the United States, estimated at 679,173 as of 2014. Though the Indian diaspora in the US is largely concentrated in metropolitan areas surrounding cities such as New York City, Washington D.C., Boston, Philadelphia, Atlanta, Chicago, Detroit, Dallas, Houston, Los Angeles, and San Francisco – almost every metropolitan area in the United States has a community of Indians.

Oceania

Australia

At the 2016 Australian census, 619,164 people stated that they had Indian ancestry, of which 455,389 were born in India, with people from India making up the third largest immigrant population in the country and the second most popular country of origin for new migrants from 2016.
Before roads and road transport were developed, many Indians had come to Australia to run camel trains. They would transport goods and mail via camels in the desert. Some of the earliest Punjabi arrivals in Australia included Kareem Bux, who came as a hawker to Bendigo in 1893, Sardar Beer Singh Johal, who came in 1895 and Sardar Narain Singh Heyer, who arrived in 1898. Many Punjabis took part in the rush for gold on the Victorian fields.

Indians also entered Australia in the first half of the 20th century when both Australia and India were both British colonies. Indian Sikhs came to work on the banana plantations in Southern Queensland. Today many of them live in the town of Woolgoolga (a town lying roughly halfway between Sydney and Brisbane). Some of these Indians, the descendants of Sikh plantation workers, now own banana farms in the area. There are two Sikh temples in Woolgoolga, one of which has a museum dedicated to Sikhism. Many Britons and Anglo-Indians born in India migrated to Australia after 1947. These British citizens decided to settle in Australia in large numbers but are still counted as Indian Nationals in the census. The third wave of Indians entered the country in the 1970s and 80s after the abolition of the White Australia policy in 1973 with many Indian teachers, doctors and other professional public service occupations settling in Australia accompanied by many IT professionals.

After successive military coups in Fiji of 1987 and 2000, a significant number of Fijian-Indians migrated to Australia; as such there is a large Fijian-Indian population in Australia. Fijian-Indians have significantly changed the character of the Indian community in Australia. While most earlier Indian migration was by educated professionals, the Fijian-Indian community was also largely by professionals but also brought many small business owners and entrepreneurs.

The current wave of Indian migration is that of engineers, toolmakers, Gujarati business families from East Africa and relatives of settled Indians. Starved of government funding, Australian education institutes are recruiting full fee paying overseas students. Many universities have permanent representatives stationed in India and other Asian countries. Their efforts have been rewarded with a new influx of Indian students entering Australia. The total number of student visas granted to Indian students for 2006–2007 was 34,136; a significant rise from 2002 to 2003, when 7,603 student visas were granted to Indian students.
According to the Australian Bureau of Statistics, 87% of Indians residing in Australia are under the age of 50, and over 83% are proficient in English.

Fiji

Indo-Fijians are Fijians whose ancestors came mainly from Uttar Pradesh and Bihar, while a very small minority hailed from Andhra Pradesh and Tamil Nadu. Later on, a small population of Gujaratis, Punjabis and Bengalis emigrated to Fiji. They number  (37.6%) (2007 census) out of a total of  people living in Fiji. They are mostly descended from indentured labourers, girmitiyas or girmit, brought to the islands by the British colonial government of Fiji between 1879 and 1916 to work on Fiji's sugar cane plantations. Music has featured prominently in Indo-Fijian culture, with a distinctive genre emerging in the first decades of the 20th century that some claim influenced early jazz musicians. One of the Indo-Fijian jazz pioneers in the early evolution of this distinct ethnic art-form, Ravinda Banjeeri, likened the struggle to be heard through music as "like a bear emerging from a dark wood, listening to twigs snapping in an otherwise silent forest". The Indo-Fijians have fought for equal rights, although with only limited success. Many have left Fiji in search of better living conditions and social justice and this exodus has gained pace with the series of coups starting in the late 1980s.

New Zealand

Indians began to arrive in New Zealand in the late eighteenth century, mostly as crews on Royal Navy] warships. The earliest known Indians to set foot in Aotearoa New Zealand were Muslim lascars who arrived in Dec 1769 on the ship Saint Jean Baptiste captained by Frenchman Jean François Marie de Surville sailing from Pondicherry, India. Their arrival marks the beginning of Indian presence in New Zealand, in which hundreds of unnamed South Asian lascars visited New Zealand on European ships in order to procure timber and seal skins. The period of Indian settlement begins with the earliest known Indian resident of New Zealand, a lascar of Bengali descent from the visiting ship City of Edinburgh who jumped ship in 1809 in the Bay of Islands to live with a Māori wife. Numbers slowly increased through the 19th and 20th centuries, despite a law change in 1899 that was designed to keep out people who were not of "British birth and parentage". As in many other countries, Indians in New Zealand, also called "Indo-Kiwis," dispersed throughout the country and had a high rate of small business ownership, particularly fruit and vegetable shops and convenience stores. At this stage most Indian New Zealanders originated from Gujarat and the Punjab. Changes in immigration policy in the 1980s allowed many more Indians, Pakistanis and Bangladeshis into the country. Today, South Asians from all over the subcontinent live and work in New Zealand, with small numbers involved in both local and national politics. Notable Indian New Zealanders include former Dunedin mayor Sukhi Turner, cricketers Dipak Patel and Jeetan Patel, singer Aaradhna, Minister Priyanca Radhakrishnan and former Governor General Anand Satyanand

West Asia

Armenia

There are over 28,000 Indian citizens in Armenia, including those who are seeking permanent residence status in Armenia, as recorded in 2018. In the first half of 2018, 10,237 Indians crossed Armenia's borders, and more than 2,000 were seeking permanent residence status.

Israel

The Bene Israel ("Sons of Israel") are an ancient group of Jews who migrated in the 18th century from villages in the Konkan area to nearby Indian cities, primarily Mumbai, but also to Pune, and Ahmedabad. In the second half of the 20th century, most of them emigrated to Israel, where they now number about 85,000. The native language of the Bene Israel is Judæo-Marathi, a form of Marathi.

Another prominent community that migrated to Israel after its creation were the Jews of Cochin, in Kerala (Cochin Jews) – a community with a very long history. They are known to have been granted protection by the king of the Princely State of Cochin. The earliest Jews in this region, as per local tradition, date to as early as 379 CE. The community was a mix of native Jews (called "Black Jews"), and European Jews (called "White Jews") who had emigrated to Cochin after the successive European conquests of Cochin. The Jewish community of Cochin spoke a variant of Malayalam, called Judeo-Malayalam. The community, after the creation of Israel, saw a mass exodus from Cochin, and is presently facing extinction in India.

Still another group of Indians to arrive in Israel belong to the Bnei Menashe ("Children of Menasseh", Hebrew בני מנשה) a group of more than 10,000 people from India's North-Eastern border states of Manipur and Mizoram, who claim descent from one of the Lost Tribes of Israel, and of whom about 3,700 now live in Israel (some of them in Israeli settlements on the West Bank). Linguistically, Bnei Menashe are Tibeto-Burmans and belong to the Mizo, Kuki and Chin peoples (the terms are virtually interchangeable). The move to convert them to Judaism and bring them to Israel is politically controversial in both India and Israel.

Persian Gulf

Indians command a dominant majority of the population Persian Gulf countries. After the 1970s oil boom in the Middle East, numerous Indians from Kerala emigrated, taking advantage of close historical ties with the 'Gulf' as well as the lack of ample skilled labour from nearby Africa and the Middle East. Major urban centers such as Dubai, Abu Dhabi, Doha and Manama were experiencing a development boom and thousands of Indians labored in construction industries.

This work was done on a contractual basis rather than permanently, and working age men continued to return home every few years. This has remained the dominant pattern as the countries in the Persian Gulf, especially United Arab Emirates, Bahrain, Qatar and Kuwait have a common policy of not naturalising non-Arabs, even if they are born there.

The Persian Gulf region has provided incomes many times over for the same type of job in India and has geographical proximity to India, and these incomes are free of taxation. The NRIs make up a good proportion of the working class in the Gulf Cooperation Council (GCC). NRI population in these GCC countries is estimated to be around 20 million, of which a quarter is resident in the United Arab Emirates (UAE). In 2005, about 75% of the population in the UAE was of Indian descent. The majority originate from Kerala, Tamil Nadu, Uttar Pradesh, Odisha, Karnataka, and Goa. Similarly, Indians are the single largest nationality in Qatar, representing around 85% of the total population as of 2014. They also form majorities in Bahrain, Kuwait, Oman.

Since the early-2000s, significant number of Indians have reached the region, taking up high skill jobs in business and industry. Major Indian corporations maintain solid regional presence there while some are headquartered there.

There is a huge population of NRIs in West Asia, most coming from Kerala and Andhra Pradesh . They work as engineers, doctors, lawyers, labourers and in clerical jobs. Unlike in Europe and America, most of the countries in West Asia do not grant citizenship or permanent residency to these Indians, however long they might live there. They have a minority in Saudi Arabia. The NRI population tends to save and remit considerable amounts to their dependents in India. It is estimated such remittances may be over US$10 billion per annum (including remittances by formal and informal channels in 2007–2008). The relative ease with which people can travel to their home country means that many NRIs in the Gulf and West Asia maintain close links to Indian culture, with people often travelling twice or thrice a year, especially during holiday period, while some live in India for several months each year. Satellite television allows many NRIs to consume Indian media and entertainment, and there are TV soaps aimed at the NRI community in the Gulf countries. Live performances and cultural events, such as Tiarts for Goans living in UAE, occur quite often and are staged by community groups.

Diaspora by state and ethnolinguistic regions of India

 Bengali diaspora
 Gujarati diaspora
 Kannadiga diaspora 
 Kashmiri diaspora
 Maharashtrian diaspora
 Malayali diaspora
 Odia diaspora 
 Punjabi diaspora
 Romani diaspora 
 Saraiki diaspora
 Sindhi diaspora
 South Indian diaspora
 Tamil diaspora
 Telugu diaspora

Diaspora by region

European colonial era diaspora

 Girmityas and Coolies
 Indo-Caribbeans
Indo-Barbadian
Indo-Belizeans
Indians in French Guiana
 Indo-Grenadians
 Indo-Guadeloupeans
 Indo-Guyanese
 Indo-Jamaicans
 Indo-Martiniquais
 Indians in Saint Kitts and Nevis
 Indo-Saint Lucian
 Indo-Surinamese
Indo-Trinidadian and Tobagonian
 Indians in the United States Virgin Islands
 Indo-Vincentian
 Indo-Fijians
Indian diaspora in Southeast Africa
 Indians in Botswana
 Indians in Kenya
 Indians in Madagascar
 Mauritians of Indian origin
 Indians in Mozambique
 Réunionnais of Indian origin 
 Indo-Seychellois
 Indians in South Africa
 Indians in Tanzania
 Indians in Uganda
 Indians in Zambia
 Indians in Zimbabwe
 Malaysian Indians
Indian Singaporeans

Mixed Indians
 Chindians
Dougla people
 Anglo-Indian people
 Eurasian Singaporeans
 Irish Indians
 Luso-Indian
Macanese people
 Scottish-Indian

Diaspora by religions

Indian-origin religions

The diaspora of indic religions are:

 Jain diaspora
 Sikh diaspora
 Buddhist diaspora
 Tibetan diaspora
 Hindu diaspora
 Balinese Hindu diaspora
 Vietnamese Balamon Cham Hindu diaspora
 Bengali Hindu diaspora

Foreign-origin religions
 Jews diaspora
Bnei Menashe diaspora
 Muslims diaspora
Indian Muslim diaspora
Ahmadiyya diaspora

Impact of Indian diaspora

Influence in India

Overseas Indians' Day 

Since 2003, the Pravasi Bharatiya Divas (Overseas Indians' Day) sponsored by Ministry of Overseas Indian Affairs, is celebrated in India on 9 January each year, to "mark the contributions of the Overseas Indian community in the development of India". The day commemorates the arrival of Mahatma Gandhi in India from South Africa, and during a three-day convention held around the day, a forum for issues concerning the Indian diaspora is held and the annual Pravasi Bharatiya Samman Awards are bestowed. As of December 2005, the Indian government has introduced the "Overseas Citizenship of India (OCI)" scheme to allow a limited form of dual citizenship to Indians, NRIs, and PIOs for the first time since independence in 1947. The PIO Card scheme is expected to be phased out in coming years in favour of the OCI programme.

Impact on India's hard and soft power 

Indian diaspora has significant impact on the globalisation of economy of India, especially in the following areas:

 Current top recipient of remittance, India has been ranked first for several years.
Remittances to India
 Foreign-exchange reserves of India
 Foreign trade of India
 Exports of India
 Business process outsourcing to India 
 H-1B visa, over 80% of all these visas are granted to Indian IT professionals 
 Indian origin CEOs of top global multinational companies
 Largest trading partners of India

Impact on other nations

Expansion of Indian soft power 
Generations of diaspora have enhanced India's soft power through proliferation of elements of Indian culture. With expansion of Indosphere cultural influence of Greater India, through transmission of Hinduism in Southeast Asia and the Silk Road transmission of Buddhism leading to Indianization of Southeast Asia through formation of non-Indian southeast Asian native Indianized kingdoms which adopted sanskritized language and other Indian elements such as the honorific titles, naming of people, naming of places, mottos of organisations and educational institutes as well as adoption of Indian architecture, martial arts, Indian music and dance, traditional Indian clothing, and Indian cuisine, a process which has also been aided by the ongoing historic expansion of Indian diaspora.

Expansion of Indian hard power

Diaspora organisation and political lobby groups

 Global Organization for People of Indian Origin
 Indian origin politicians in other nations
 Overseas Citizens of India

Relations with other diasporas
Political lobbying groups of Indian diaspora influence the foreign policies of other nations in India's favor. Indian diaspora's lobby groups especially collaborate well with the influential Jewish diaspora in the Western world for creating favorable outcome for India and Israel. Indian diaspora has good relations with most other diasporas, including its offshoot Bangladeshi and Pakistani diasporas, as well all other SAARC neighbors such as Afghan, Bhutanese, Burmese, Nepali. Sri Lankan, and Tibetan diasporas.

Cultural, economic and political impact on other nations 
The diaspora has led to politicians of Indian ancestry becoming leaders of the countries of their residence. This list includes full-ethnic Indian heads of states and governments such as Basdeo Panday, Kamla Persad-Bissessar, Christine Kangaloo, and Noor Hassanali of Trinidad and Tobago, Cheddi Jagan, Donald Ramotar, Bharrat Jagdeo, Moses Nagamootoo, and
Irfaan Ali of Guyana, Chan Santokhi, Ramsewak Shankar, Pretaap Radhakishun, and Fred Ramdat Misier of Suriname, Mahendra Chaudhry of Fiji, Pravind Jugnauth, Prithvirajsing Roopun, Anerood Jugnauth, Kailash Purryag, Ameenah Gurib-Fakim, Navin Ramgoolam, Veerasamy Ringadoo, and Seewoosagur Ramgoolam of Mauritius, Devan Nair and S. R. Nathan of Singapore, and  Rishi Sunak of U.K. and those of mixed heritage, such as Mahathir Mohamad of Malaysia, António Costa and Alfredo Nobre da Costa of Portugal, Leo Varadkar of Ireland, Halimah Yacob of Singapore, and Wavel Ramkalawan of Seychelles. Additionally Kamala Harris who is of mixed Jamaican and Indian heritage is the Vice President of the United States and Anand Satyanand who is of Indo-Fijian descent served as the Governor-General of New Zealand.

In Australia, Indian Australians and India were the largest source of new permanent migrants to Australia in 2017–2018, and Indians were the most educated migrant group in Australia with 54.6% of Indian migrants in Australia holding a bachelor's or higher educational degree, which is more than three times Australia's national average of 17.2% in 2011.

In Britain, British Indians are the largest ethnic minority population in the country, with the highest average hourly pay rate and the lowest poverty rate among all ethnic groups, and are more likely to be employed in professional and managerial occupations than other ethnic groups. Rishi Sunak is the first British Indian (non-white) Prime Minister of the United Kingdom from October 2022.

In Canada, Indo-Canadians are the second largest non-European ethnic group and one of the fastest growing ethnic communities in the country.

In New Zealand, Indian New Zealanders are the fastest growing Kiwi ethnic group, and are the second largest group of Asians in New Zealand with a population of 174,000 Indians in 2014. Fiji Hindi is the fourth largest language in New Zealand.

In the United States, Indian Americans are the third largest Asian American ethnic group behind Chinese Americans and Filipino Americans, by far the richest and most educated ethnic group in the USA compared to all other ethnic groups, earning $101,591 median income per year compared to $51,000 and $56,000 for overall immigrant and native-born households in 2015, with the lowest poverty rate compared to other foreign-born and U.S. born ethnic groups. Overall, Indians are also more educated than other ethnic groups with an average of 32% and 40% of Indians holding a bachelor's degree and postgraduate degree respectively, compared to the 30% and 21% average of all Asians in the United States, and the 19% and 11% average of Americans overall. 15.5% of all Silicon Valley startups by 2006 were founded by Indian immigrants, and Indian migrants have founded more engineering and technology companies from 1995 to 2005 than immigrants from the UK, China, Taiwan and Japan combined. Over 80% of all H-1B visas are granted to Indian IT professionals and 23% of all Indian business school graduates in USA take up a job in United States.

Issues

Demand for dual citizenship in India by PIO and NRIs 
Coinciding with Prime Minister Narendra Modi's Australia visit in November 2014, the Indian community in Australia had launched an online campaign, appealing to him to grant dual citizenship to overseas Indians. The petition has also sought granting Indian passports to overseas citizens of Indian heritage with full political and economic rights, granting of convenient voting rights to such dual passport-holding overseas Indians as well as overseas Indians with Indian passports (NRIs), which can be exercised either at the consulate, high commission or embassy premises in their country of residence and through postal or online facilities.

See also

 Overseas Citizenship of India
 Politicians of Indian descent
 Indian nationality law
 Indianisation
 Greater India
 Indosphere
 Anti-Indian sentiment
 Proto-Indo-Europeans
 Indo-Aryan peoples
 Dravidian peoples
 Romani people
 Romani diaspora

Notes

References

External links

 Ministry of External Affairs, Government of India
 Bureau of immigration India
 Non-Resident Indians | National Portal of India

Indian diaspora